Cally is an English feminine given name of Greek origins as a diminutive form of "Callandra". It is also an English feminine given name that is a form of Carrie and a diminutive form of Caroline.

People

Given name
Cally Kwong (born 1962), Hong Kong singer, actress and businesswoman
Cally Oldershaw, gemologist and science educator
Cally Taylor, English author
Cally-Jo Pothecary (born 1989), British fine artist and tattoo artist

Nickname
 Cally Beaton (born 1969), nickname of Caroline Beaton, British stand-up comedian, writer, executive coach and former TV executive
 Cally Monrad (1879–1950), nickname of Ragnhild Caroline Monrad, Norwegian singer, actress and poet
 Cally Gault (1927–2019), nickname of Calhoun Folk Gault, American gridiron football coach and college athletics administrator

Surname
 Pierre Cally (1630–1709), French Catholic Cartesian philosopher and theologian

Pseudonym
 Junior Cally (born 1991), pseudonym of Antonio Signore, Italian rapper

Fictional characters
 Cally (Blake's 7), from the British science fiction television series Blake's 7
 Cally Harper Ewing, from the television series Dallas
 Cally Stone, a main character in the television series Dark Oracle

See also

 The "Cally", a local colloquial name for the Caledonian Road, London, UK
 Callie (disambiguation)
 Calley, a surname
 Cally (ship, 1944), see Boats of the Mackenzie River watershed
Caloy

References

Feminine given names